Arne Andersson (27 October 1917 – 1 April 2009) was a Swedish middle distance runner who became famous for his rivalry with his compatriot Gunder Hägg in the 1940s. Anderson set a 1500 metres world record in Gothenburg in August 1943 with a time of 3:45.0 minutes. He was born in Trollhättan, Sweden.

Andersson set three world records in the mile: the first in Stockholm in July 1942 in (4:06.2); this record was broken in the same year by Hägg (4:04.6). Andersson recaptured the world record in Gothenburg in July 1943 (4:02.6), and improved it further in Malmö in July 1944 (4:01.6). However, Hägg had the last word when he ran (4:01.4) in Malmö in 1945 (Hägg's record was not broken until Roger Bannister ran the first sub-4 mile in Oxford in 1954). Andersson won the Svenska Dagbladet Gold Medal in 1943.

Andersson won seven national titles: two individual (1500 m, 1943–44) and five in relays (1940–42). In 1946 he was disqualified for violating amateur rules, together with Gunder Hägg and Henry Jonsson.

References

1917 births
2009 deaths
People from Trollhättan Municipality
World record setters in athletics (track and field)
Swedish male middle-distance runners
Örgryte IS Friidrott athletes
Sportspeople from Västra Götaland County